John Francis Leso (born August 13, 1966) is an American psychologist and a major in the United States Armed Services, who is reported to have aided interrogators at Guantanamo Bay detention camp. Leso co-authored an October 2002 memo which "recommended physically and psychologically harmful and abusive detention and interrogation tactics", which were used on Mohammed al-Qahtani, the alleged 20th hijacker. Information on Al-Qahtani's interrogation became public when a classified interrogation log was leaked to Time. Leso's name was included in the leaked log, which triggered debate in the medical community about the role of psychologists in supporting military interrogations. Debate is ongoing about the effectiveness and ethics of the interrogation techniques used with Al-Qhatani, as many consider them torture. Although some activist psychologists have criticized Leso for "directing" the interrogation of Al-Qhatani, scrutiny of public sources on the matter reveals that Leso's actual role and duties remain unclear.

Academic career
Leso attended Johns Hopkins University. Upon completion of his undergraduate degree Leso was commissioned as a Second Lieutenant. He received a Ph.D. in psychology from SUNY, in Albany New York, in 1995.

Professional career

See also
Larry C. James
Nuremberg Code
Bruce Jessen
James Elmer Mitchell
Behavioral Science Consultation Team

Bibliography
 James, L.C. (2008) Fixing Hell: An Army Psychologist Confronts Abu Ghraib. Grand Central Publishing.

References

External links
Complaints allege psychologists had role in Guantanamo detainee abuse
John Leso profile

Living people
21st-century American psychologists
1966 births
20th-century American psychologists